Liliana Cátia Pereira Santos  Aveiro (born 5 October 1977) is a Portuguese pop singer. She launched her singing career in 2005 under the artistic name Ronalda, in reference to her brother, footballer Cristiano Ronaldo, releasing the album Pronta P'ra Te Amar, a romantic pop album with slow songs.

In 2008, Aveiro wrote the song "Vivo na Esperança de Te Ver" with her brother Cristiano with lyrics that honor their father Dinis Aveiro, who died in 2005. In 2009, Aveiro stopped singing and dedicated herself to her two children and opened the CR7 stores in partnership with her sister with her brother's products. She resumed her music career in 2012. In July 2013, she released the single "Boom Sem Parar" which reached 750,000 views on YouTube in fifteen days. The song was produced by RedOne, a regular contributor to Lady Gaga and Jennifer Lopez's albums.

Personal life
Aveiro is the mother of Dinis (born 2010) and Rodrigo (born 2000), from her relationship with José Pereira. From her relationship with Alexandre Bertolucci, a Brazilian businessman, she is the mother of Valentina (born 2019).

References

1977 births
Living people
People from Funchal
21st-century Portuguese women singers
Spanish-language singers of Portugal
Latin pop singers